Loscil is the electronic/ambient music project of Scott Morgan from Vancouver, British Columbia, Canada. Morgan launched the project in Vancouver in 1998 while a member of the multimedia collective Multiplex, which curated audiovisual events at an underground cinema called The Blinding Light. The name Loscil is taken from the "looping oscillator" function (loscil) in Csound.

Morgan was also the drummer for the Vancouver indie band Destroyer. As Loscil, he has also produced numerous special projects, remixes, and collaborations with other musicians, including Ryuichi Sakamoto, Murcof/Vanessa Wagner, Sarah Neufeld, Daniel Bejar, bvdub, Rachel Grimes, and Kelly Wyse.

Career 
Loscil graduated from Simon Fraser University's School for the Contemporary Arts, where he studied with computer-music pioneer Barry Truax.

2000s 
A self-released album titled A New Demonstration of Thermodynamic Tendencies caught the attention of experimental music label Kranky, which signed Morgan on to release his debut album Triple Point in 2001. The album features six tracks off his first independent release as well as four new tracks.

Loscil followed up the release with Submers, an aquatic-themed album. Each track on the album is named after a submarine. The last track on the album was produced in honour of the people who died on the Russian submarine K-141 Kursk.

Loscil's 2004 album First Narrows (a reference to the official name of the Vancouver bridge, also known as Lions' Gate Bridge) marked the incorporation of improvised performances by a number of guest musicians: Nyla Raney on cello, Tim Loewen on guitar and Jason Zumpano on Rhodes piano. Consequently, the music pieces (or tone poems) on First Narrows are "more organic and looser in nature" than Morgan's previous work.

Eight of Loscil's tone poems were featured on the film score of the 2004 documentary Scared Sacred by the award-winning documentary filmmaker Velcrow Ripper.

In 2005, Morgan released Stases, a collection of drones based upon the backgrounds of his work for Kranky. The album was made available as a free download-only release from One Records.

The theme of Loscil's fourth major album, released in 2006, continued the conceptual ascent that each of his previous albums took, from the "subatomic level" and watery depths of Triple Point and Submers, respectively, to the surface alluded to by First Narrows and the sky referenced in Plume.

Plume also continued Morgan's musical integration of other musicians' work into his ambient compositions, including those by Josh August Lindstrom on vibes and xylophone and Krista Michelle Marshall and Stephen Michael Wood on EBow guitar, as well as Zumpano again on piano.

2010s 
In a 2014 interview with Exberliner, Loscil described a facet of his 2014 album thus: "Vancouver is the ideal setting, and I say that in a sort of ironic way. The nature is so beautiful but it’s coupled with human intervention. [My 2014 album] Sea Island is really inspired by that contrast. That area being a nature reserve as well as an industrial area and an airport is both beautiful and kind of horrific. I relish that contrast. There’s a balance there that I find interesting from a musical perspective. It opens the door to interpretation."

In December 2016, American webzine Somewherecold ranked Loscil's Monument Builders No. 4 on their Somewherecold Awards 2016 list.

In 2019, Loscil released Equivalents, a reworking of piano samples inspired by Alfred Stieglitz’ black-and-white photographs of clouds. Pitchfork described the album as "full of wispy high pitches that swirl around waves of pink noise and slowly moving tone clusters."

2020s 
In March 2021, Loscil announced the May 28 release of a new 10-track album called Clara. As basis for the tracks, Loscil used a short orchestral recording, which is from a single three-minute composition performed by a 22-piece string orchestra in Budapest. Upon its release, Clara was met with critical acclaim, attaining on reviews aggregator Metacritic a score of 85, indicating "universal acclaim".

Discography

Studio albums 
1999 A New Demonstration of Thermodynamic Tendencies
2001 Triple Point (Kranky)
2002 Submers (Kranky)
2004 First Narrows (Kranky)
2006 Plume (Kranky)
2010 Endless Falls (Kranky)
2011 Coast / Range / Arc (Glacial Movements)
2012 Sketches From New Brighton (Kranky)
2013 Erebus (with Bvdub) (Glacial Movements)
2014 Sea Island (Kranky)
2016 Monument Builders (Kranky)
2019 Equivalents (Kranky)
2019 Lifelike (Frond)
2020 Faults, Coasts, Lines (bandcamp)
2020 Adrift
2021 Clara (Kranky)
2022 The Sails (Frond)

EPs and other releases
2001 Involve Ep02 (Involve Records)
2005 Stases (Drones 2001–2005) (One)
2009 Strathcona Variations EP (Ghostly International)
2010 Versions EP (bandcamp)
2010 Untitled EP (bandcamp)
2012 City Hospital (Wist Rec)
2013 Intervalo (featuring Kelly Wyse) (Frond)
2014 Fury and Hecla (with Fieldhead) (Gizeh Records)
2015 ADRIFT (app for iOS and Android) (Frond)
2016 Suns (Frond - cassette only)
2016 The Air at Night (Live at Subtrata) (with Rachel Grimes) (Mossgrove Music)
2016 Lodge (1631 Recordings)

Tracks featured on
2003 Saturday Morning Empires (Intr Version)
2003 The Corporation documentary film soundtrack
2004 ScaredSacred documentary film soundtrack
2006 Idol Tryouts: Ghostly International Vol. 2 (Ghostly International)
2008 The Sleep Machine contributed to Chequerboards online Relay project
2009 Osmos computer game
2013 Hundreds iOS game
2014 Divergent (film)
2014 From the Sky (film)
2017 Suburra: Blood on Rome (Netflix) - Sturgeon Bank + Bleeding Ink (from 2014 Sea Island) / Anthropocene (from 2016 Monument Builders)
2019 Lifelike'' iOS game

See also
List of ambient music artists
List of musicians from British Columbia

References

External links
Official website

Loscil at Kranky
"Environmental Music: Loscil's Impressionistic Portraits CBC Radio 3 Live Concert Session

Living people
Ambient musicians
Canadian electronic musicians
Musicians from Vancouver
Year of birth missing (living people)